Hicham Mahou (born 2 July 1999) is a French professional footballer who plays as a right winger for Swiss Super League club Lugano.

Club career
Mahou made his professional debut for Nice in a 3–3 Ligue 1 draw against Lyon on 20 May 2017. In January 2020, he was loaned to Red Star until the end of the 2019–20 season.

International career
Born in France, Mahou is of Moroccan descent. He is a youth international for France.

Career statistics

References

External links
 
 
 
 
 Maxifoot Profile
 

Living people
1999 births
Footballers from Nice
Association football midfielders
French footballers
France youth international footballers
French sportspeople of Moroccan descent
Ligue 1 players
Championnat National players
Championnat National 2 players
Championnat National 3 players
Swiss Super League players
OGC Nice players
Red Star F.C. players
FC Lausanne-Sport players
FC Lugano players
French expatriate footballers
French expatriate sportspeople in Switzerland
Expatriate footballers in Switzerland